Kimberley Nixon (born 24 September 1985) is a Welsh actress. Nixon is known for her role as Sophy Hutton in the BBC One period drama Cranford, and appearances in various films such as Wild Child and Angus, Thongs and Perfect Snogging. More recently she has starred as Josie Jones in the Channel 4 comedy-drama Fresh Meat and as Sarah Pearson in the BBC Two comedy Hebburn.

Early life and education
Born in Bristol to Welsh parents, Nixon and her six brothers were raised in Pontypridd, Wales, where she attended Coedylan Comprehensive School, now known as Pontypridd High School.

After high school, Nixon trained at the Royal Welsh College of Music & Drama in Cardiff alongside Tom Cullen and Aneurin Barnard. Before her graduation in 2007, she signed to Universal Studios after appearing in a college production of The Comedy of Errors. She is a former member of the National Youth Theatre of Wales.

Career
Nixon's career began in 2007, when she starred as the motherless Sophy Hutton in the BBC One costume drama series Cranford. In 2008, she had supporting roles in the films Wild Child and Angus, Thongs and Perfect Snogging.

In September 2008, she made her stage debut as Griet in a tour and London run of an adaptation of Girl with a Pearl Earring.

Nixon appeared in Easy Virtue and played one of the leads in Cherrybomb opposite Rupert Grint and Robert Sheehan, before starring in Black Death. In 2011, Nixon played Josie in the Channel 4 TV comedy-drama series Fresh Meat, and starred alongside Michael Sheen, Andrea Riseborough and Iwan Rheon in Resistance, an adaptation of an Owen Sheers novel, which was released in the UK in November 2011.

Nixon appeared in the musical film Hunky Dory, which is set in 1976 Swansea, with Minnie Driver, Aneurin Barnard and George MacKay, directed by Marc Evans. The film premièred at the 55th BFI London Film Festival on 25 October 2011, and was released officially on 2 March 2012 in the UK.

Nixon starred alongside Jaime Winstone and Aneurin Barnard in Elfie Hopkins and the Gammons, a horror film about an aspiring teen detective who stumbles into her first real case when investigating the mysterious new family, the Gammons, in her neighbourhood. The film was released on 20 April 2012.

In 2012, Nixon starred in the movie Offender, a thriller about a man who sets up his own imprisonment in order to avenge the assault of his girlfriend. She also had leading roles in the ITV drama series "Kidnap and Ransom" and the BBC Two comedy-drama series Hebburn, alongside Chris Ramsey and Vic Reeves. The sitcom is written by stand-up comic Jason Cook and is based on his experiences of growing up in the north-east of England.

In June 2013, Nixon starred in "Greenshaw's Folly" in the sixth series of ITV's Agatha Christie's Marple, with Matt Willis, Fiona Shaw, Julia Sawalha, Vic Reeves and Martin Compston.

She starred in the 2014 BBC One Wales television remake of Dylan Thomas' radio drama Under Milk Wood as Myfanwy Price.

She also starred in the Playhouse Presents one-off episode The Dog Thrower, with Matthew Perry and Tim Key, which aired on 1 May 2014 on Sky Arts.

Nixon starred in the medical drama Critical, with Lennie James, Emma Fryer and Paul Bazely, that debuted on Sky 1 on 24 February 2015. She also starred in a Welsh thriller titled Kingdom of Rain, with Julian Lewis Jones and Robert Kazinsky. She took a lead role in the third season of Outlander.

In 2022, Nixon appeared as Donna in the BBC drama Life and Death in the Warehouse.

In 2023, Nixon played the role of Ms Parkinson in Channel 4's standalone drama Consent.

Personal life
Nixon is a supporter of Humanists UK.

Filmography

References

External links

1985 births
Alumni of the Royal Welsh College of Music & Drama
Living people
People from Pontypridd
British film actresses
Welsh humanists
Welsh television actresses
National Youth Theatre members